YU rock magazin (trans. YU Rock Magazine) was a Serbian music magazine.

History
YU rock magazin was founded in 1994. in Belgrade  The magazine's Editor-in-Chiefs was Ivan Tarle. The first issue was released on March 1, 1994, and the last, 45th/46th issue was released in November 1996.

References

Defunct magazines published in Serbia
Magazines established in 1994
Magazines disestablished in 1996
Music magazines published in Serbia
Serbian-language magazines
Serbian rock music